Nadeera Nawela (born 4 October 1984) is a Sri Lankan first-class cricketer who plays for Badureliya Sports Club.

References

External links
 

1984 births
Living people
Sri Lankan cricketers
Ampara District cricketers
Badureliya Sports Club cricketers
Colombo Commandos cricketers